Maksim Roaldovich Osadchy (full name Maksim Osadchy-Korytkovsky; born August 8, 1965) is a Russian cinematographer, actor and director of the clips. Winner of the Golden Eagle (2) and Nika Award.

Biography 
Maksim  was born on August 8, 1965 in Krasnoyarsk. He graduated from VGIK (workshop of Vladimir Nakhabtsev).

He shot commercials of beer, sparkling water, chocolate Nestlé and mobile operators MTS and Beeline. He made music videos for singers: Linda, Valery Leontiev, Philip Kirkorov, Dmitry Malikov, Leonid Agutin, Alla Pugacheva, Valery Meladze, Kirill Turichenko, Smash, Julia Savicheva, Angelica Agurbash and others.

Cooperates with the director Fyodor Bondarchuk.

Filmography 
1988: Etude of Lighting (short)
1989: Markun
1990: In the Land of the Sun
1991: Sexy Tales
1992: Alisa and second-hand bookshop
1998: The Unfamiliar Weapon, or the Crusader 2
1999: The War of the Princess
2000: The President and His Granddaughter
2001: Old Songs About the Main Thing. Postscript
 2005: The 9th Company
 2006: Heat
2006: The Day of Money
2006: Breathe in and Out
 2009: Dark Planet
2011: Without Men
2011: Two Days
2012: Kokoko
2013: Stalingrad
2013: The Startup
2013: Odnoklassniki.ru: OnCLICKy luck
 2016: The Duelist
 2016: Versus 
 2017: Guardians
 2017: Furious
 2018: Story of One Appointment
 2019: Goalkeeper of the Galaxy

Personal life
Has one child from marriage to actress Maria Antipova. He was married to actress Elena Korikova and brought up her son. Lived a civil marriage with actress Yuliya Snigir, whom he met on the set of the film  The Inhabited Island. He met with the soloist of the group Blestyashchiye Nadezhda Ruchka.

References

External links

 Интервью

1965 births
Soviet cinematographers
Russian cinematographers
Russian music video directors
Recipients of the Nika Award
Actors  from Krasnoyarsk
Living people
Gerasimov Institute of Cinematography alumni